Candice Bergen may refer to:

 Candice Bergen (actress)
 Candice Bergen (politician)

Disambiguation pages
Human name disambiguation pages